Syed Jaaved Ahmed Jaaferi (born 4 December 1963) is an Indian actor, dancer, and comedian who has appeared in Hindi films and television shows.  He is son of the comedian Jagdeep. He joined the Aam Aadmi Party (AAP) in March, 2014 and contested the 2014 Indian general election from the Lucknow constituency, finishing fifth.

Professional work
Javed Jaffrey is the son of comedian Jagdeep. He dubbed Mickey Mouse, Goofy and Don Karnage in Hindi for Disney and scripted the Hindi version of Disney's Jungle Book 2 and Pixar The Incredibles as well as voicing the antagonist. He played Charlie Anna in the animated film Roadside Romeo, a collaborative effort of Yash Raj Films and Disney. He has commentated on the Japanese TV show Takeshi's Castle and Ninja Warrior on Pogo TV and Hungama respectively. He was also the judge for Karaoke World Championships India, with Manasi Scott, music director Raju Singh, Salim Merchant, Sulaiman Merchant, founder and organizer of KWC INDIA, Savio Paul D'sa, Leslie Lewis, Remo Fernandes, and Sunita Rao.

Jaffrey has hosted award shows including Filmfare, Zee Cine Awards, and IIFA. He has also appeared in the Pakistani programme Loose Talk, portraying various characters from India.

He has been associated with advertising since 1980 as a model, choreographer, copywriter, producer and director. He has appeared in the comical Maggi Hot & Sweet Sauce commercials for 25 years.

Jaffrey hosted Big Googly on BIG 92.7FM created with Paritosh Painter. He also hosted Once More, where he talks about Bollywood films from the 1970s to the 1990s in his comic style, on Epic channel since 2015.

Jaffrey has been awarded the life membership of International Film And Television Club of Asian Academy of Film & Television. He was also the brand ambassador of the first India International Animation and Cartoon Film festival 2015.

Film background
The film Meri Jung, released in 1985, gave him his first opportunity to enact the role of a villain and showcase his dancing powers on screen. The launch of cable TV, particularly Channel [V] and its irreverent sense of humour, gave him a niche to depict his brand of comedy. He was called "TVdom's first real superstar". He anchored the show Videocon Flashback. Jaffrey also anchored the song programme, Timex Timepass, in which he shifted between the caricatures of characters.

He won his first IIFA Award for best comic role in Salaam Namaste in 2005. He hosts the dance competition show Boogie Woogie on Sony Entertainment Television Asia with his brother Naved Jaffery and friend Ravi Behl. He recently started hosting a game show called Mai Ka Laal on Disney Channel India which airs on Sundays at 5pm.

Political career 
Jaffrey contested the 2014 Lok Sabha Elections from Lucknow as a candidate of Aam Aadmi Party but lost to BJP's Rajnath Singh. He had finished fifth in the constituency securing 41,429 votes.

Filmography

Television

Dubbing roles

Animated films and shows

Live action series

Awards and nominations
 Won, IIFA Best Comedian Award for Salaam Namaste (2006)
 Nominated, Filmfare Award for Best Performance in a Comic Role: Salaam Namaste (2006)
 Won, National Film Award for Best Film on Social Issues: Inshaallah, Football (2011)- As a producer
Nominated, Best Entertainment Presenter/Host, Animals Gone Wild with Jaaved Jaaferi, 26th Asian Television Awards

References

External links

 

1963 births
Living people
Indian male voice actors
Indian Shia Muslims
Jaffrey, Javed
Jaffrey, Javed
Indian television producers
Indian male comedians
Muslim male comedians
Male actors from Mumbai
Aam Aadmi Party candidates in the 2014 Indian general election
Aam Aadmi Party politicians
21st-century Indian politicians
Alumni of the Manchester Business School
Politicians from Mumbai
20th-century Indian male actors
21st-century Indian male actors
Indian actor-politicians